Nuremberg Diary is Gustave Gilbert's account of interviews he conducted during the Nuremberg trials of Nazi leaders, including Hermann Göring, involved in World War II and the Holocaust.

Gilbert, a fluent German speaker, served as a prison psychologist in Nuremberg, arriving on October 20th 1945, where he had close contact with those on trial. The text is the verbatim notes Gilbert took immediately after having conversations with the prisoners, information backed up by essays he asked them to write about themselves. 

Following the indictments, Gilbert writes: "I asked each of the defendants to autography my copy... with a brief statement giving his opinion of it". Out of the twenty responses received, most either proclaimed personal innocence while blaming Hitler and Himmler, or dismissed the charges entirely. Rosenberg and Streicher blamed the Jews.

Background and Contents of the Book 

In 1945, after the end of the war, Gilbert was sent to Nuremberg, Germany, as a translator for the International Military Tribunal for the trials of the World War II German prisoners. Gilbert was appointed the prison psychologist of the German prisoners. During the process of the trials Gilbert became, after Douglas Kelley, the confidant of Hermann Göring, Joachim von Ribbentrop, Wilhelm Keitel, Hans Frank, Oswald Pohl, Otto Ohlendorf, Rudolf Höss, and Ernst Kaltenbrunner, among others. Gilbert and Kelley administered the Rorschach inkblot test to the 22 defendants in the Nazi leadership group prior to the first set of trials. Gilbert also participated in the Nuremberg trials as the American Military Chief Psychologist and provided testimony attesting to the sanity of Rudolf Hess.

In 1946, after the trials, Gilbert returned to the US. Gilbert stayed busy teaching, researching, and writing. In 1947 he published part of his diary, consisting of observations taken during interviews, interrogations, "eavesdropping" and conversations with German prisoners, under the title Nuremberg Diary. (This diary was reprinted in full in 1961 just before the trial of Adolf Eichmann in Jerusalem.)

The following is a famous exchange Gilbert had with Göring from this book:

Publication History and Editions 

The diary was first published in 1947, again in 1948, and reissued in 1961, just before the trial of Adolf Eichmann in Jerusalem.

The 1948 London edition contains a foreword by Sir David Maxwell Fyfe, Deputy Chief Prosecutor for the British Legation. The edition is abridged, although this is not stated. For example, Göring's comment that "the people can always be brought to the bidding of the leaders.  That is easy. All you have to do is tell them they are being attacked and denounce the pacifists for lack of patriotism and exposing the country to danger. It works the same way in any country." is not present.

References

Nuremberg trials